The NIH Record is a publication of the United States government for employees of the National Institutes of Health. Founded in 1949, it is published 25 times every year and circulated to 20,000 readers.

References

Newspapers published in Maryland
National Institutes of Health
Publications of the United States government
Publications established in 1949